Vilhelmina Airport  is an airport in the village of Sagadal outside Vilhelmina, Sweden. The airport has recently been given an alternative name, South Lapland Airport.

Airlines and destinations

Statistics

See also
 List of the largest airports in the Nordic countries

References

Airports in Sweden